Farah Hussein (born 7 October 2001) is an Egyptian artistic gymnast.

Hussein competed at the 2019 African Games where she won gold medals in the individual all-around, uneven bars, beam and team all-around events. She also won a bronze medal at the 2019 Artistic Gymnastics Koper World Challenge Cup series in the balance beam event.

References

2001 births
Living people
Egyptian female artistic gymnasts
African Games medalists in gymnastics
African Games gold medalists for Egypt
21st-century Egyptian women
Competitors at the 2019 African Games